The Pont De Rennes bridge is located in the Brown's Race Historic District of Rochester New York at the base of the High Falls where it spans the Genesee River. The Pont De Rennes bridge formerly carried Platt Street  over the river but was converted to pedestrian use in 1982 as part of a redevelopment of the High Falls area as an entertainment area. The bridge was renamed the Pont De Rennes for Rochester's sister city Rennes in France as part of the conversion. The Pont De Rennes bridge provides unobstructed views of the High Falls and downstream gorge.

The bridge was designed by Leffert Buck, who also designed the Williamsburg Bridge in New York City.

Gallery

References

Bridges completed in 1891
Genesee River
Bridges in Rochester, New York
Tourist attractions in Rochester, New York
Road bridges in New York (state)
Pedestrian bridges in New York (state)
Former road bridges in the United States
1891 establishments in New York (state)
Steel bridges in the United States